Emil Oskar Nobel (a.k.a. Oscar; 	29 October 1843 – 3 September 1864) was a member of the Nobel family.

Biography
Emil Nobel was born in Saint Petersburg,  Russia. He was the youngest son of Immanuel Nobel (1801–1872) and Karolina Andrietta Ahlsell (1803–1889). He was the brother of Robert Nobel, Ludvig Nobel and Alfred Nobel. In 1842, Immanuel Nobel opened a workshop with foundry in St. Petersburg returning to Sweden in 1859 with his youngest sons Emil and Alfred. Emil was the only member of the family to go to college, attending the University of Uppsala.

Emil died together with several other factory workers, the victim of an explosion while experimenting with nitroglycerine at Nobels Sprängolja, his father's factory at Heleneborg in Stockholm. At the time, Nobel was a student in Uppsala, but also helped in the factory. After the explosion, production of nitroglycerin was banned in the factory, but continued close to Heleneborg on an anchored barge in a bay of Lake Mälaren.

His brother Alfred was not in the factory at the time of Emil's death but later managed to stabilize dynamite with a diatomaceous earth called kieselguhr.

References

Other sources
Förfärlig olyckshändelse i Stockholm. Nya Dagligt Allehanda. 3 September 1864

1843 births
1864 deaths
Emil Oskar
Uppsala University alumni
Deaths from explosion
Industrial accident deaths